Palakeedu is a village in Suryapet district of Telangana, India. It is located in Palakeedu mandal of Suryapet revenue division. It is about 48 km from the district headquarters Suryapet.

References

Mandal headquarters in Suryapet district
Villages in Suryapet district